Nasdaq Private Market (NPM) provides a secondary market trading venue for issuers, brokers, shareholders, and prospective investors of private company stock. Since inception, NPM has facilitated more than $40 billion in transactional volume and has worked with 400+ private companies and 100,000+ employees, stakeholders, and investors. NPM offers private company and investors different solutions including tender offers, auctions, block trades, and custom company marketplaces.  In 2021, NPM spun-off of Nasdaq to become its own, independent company receiving strategic investments from Silicon Valley Bank, Citi, Goldman Sachs, Morgan Stanley, and Allen and Co.

SecondMarket Solutions changed its name to NASDAQ Private Market after being acquired by NASDAQ in a joint venture with SharesPost. In October 2015 NASDAQ took full ownership of NASDAQ Private Market. Prior to using the name SecondMarket the company was known as Restricted Stock Partners, Inc.

History
SecondMarket was founded in 2004 by Barry Silbert to provide liquidity for restricted securities in public companies. Beginning in early 2008, SecondMarket expanded into other asset classes—first auction‐rate securities, then bankruptcy claims, limited partnership interests, structured products (MBS, CDO, ABS), whole loans, private company stock, government IOUs and bitcoins.

In 2007, the company raised an undisclosed amount of Series A financing from venture capital firm Pequot Ventures. In February 2010, the company raised US$15 million in Series B funding to aid its expansion into Asia. In November 2011, the company announced that they had closed a US$15 million Series C round, led by The Social+Capital Partnership. The last round of investment valued SecondMarket at US$200 million, up from a valuation of about US$150 million set in the previous round in February 2010.

The World Economic Forum listed the company as a Technology Pioneer for 2011.

The firm's private-company transactions totaled $100 million in 2009, and $400 million in 2010. SecondMarket takes fees from 3 to 5 percent on each trade (split evenly between buyer and seller). In March 2011, it had 53,000 registered participants, up from 35,000 in 2010, 6,500 in 2009 and 2,500 in 2008.

In 2015, NASDAQ acquired Second Market Solutions, which was a competitor to NASDAQ's Private Market initiative. NASDAQ rebranded Second Market Solutions as NASDAQ Private Market.

Markets Trading on SecondMarket

Restricted Securities in Public Companies
Restricted securities, SecondMarket's initial market, utilizes privately negotiated transactions to provide access to liquidity in the trillion dollar restricted securities market.

Bankruptcy Claims Market
SecondMarket entered into the bankruptcy claims market in June 2008 by acquiring Trade Receivable Exchange, Inc. (T-REX) of Denver, at the time the largest online auction platform serving the bankruptcy trade claims market.

Limited Partnership Interests Market
In February 2009, SecondMarket opened its marketplace to limited partnership (LP) interests, which are ownership rights in investment entities such as private equity funds, real estate funds, hedge funds, and fund of funds. Through this market, current limited partners are able to transfer future capital commitments to other investors.

Structured Products
In April 2009, Secondmarket opened the collateralized debt obligation (CDO) and mortgage-backed security (MBS) markets.

Whole Loans
Launched in April 2009, SecondMarket's whole loans market facilitates transactions in residential, commercial and specialty loan types. SecondMarket transacts in both performing and non-performing individual loans as well as entire loan portfolios.

Private Company Stock Market
SecondMarket's market for stock in private companies opened in April 2009 and facilitates transactions in both debt and equity securities in private companies. Through SecondMarket, private companies can opt into an organized, controlled private environment that offers early investors and employee shareholders exit opportunity prior to an IPO or M&A event.

Government IOUs
SecondMarket's government warrant market facilitates transactions in registered warrants (IOUs) issued by state governments. When the state of California issued warrants to its creditors in mid-2009, SecondMarket opened up a market place to facilitate the trading of government IOUs.

Bitcoin
The Bitcoin Investment Trust (BIT) is a private, open-ended trust that derives its value solely from the price of bitcoin. The NASDAQ Private Market (formerly known as "SecondMarket") acts as the custodian and the trust is audited by Ernst & Young. The trust is managed through a subsidiary of SecondMarket, which is the Digital Currency Group and Grayscale. Grayscale also manages the Ethereum Classic Investment Trust

SecondMarket (now known as the NASDAQ Private Market) announced in February 2014 that it planned to open a regulated, US-based bitcoin exchange. It was planning to spin off a separate company for all its Bitcoin activities.

See also
 Exhilway private capital market
 Campbell Lutyens
 Cogent Partners
 Probitas Partners
 Triago

References

External links
 Official website

Internet properties established in 2004
American companies established in 2004
2015 mergers and acquisitions
Nasdaq